Dani may refer to:

People
 Dani people, a people living in the central highlands of West Papua
 Dani (surname), a surname
 Danes (Germanic tribe), a tribe in southern Scandinavia
 Dani (footballer, born 1951) (Daniel Ruiz-Bazán Justa), Spanish striker
 Dani (footballer, born 1976) (Daniel da Cruz Carvalho), Portuguese midfielder
 Dani (footballer, born 1981) (Daniel Martín Alexandre), Spanish striker
 Dani (footballer, born 1982) (Daniel Ricardo da Silva Soares), Portuguese midfielder
 Dani (footballer, born 1990) (Daniel Filipe Faria Coelho), Portuguese right back
 Dani (game developer) (Daniel Sooman, born 1997), Norwegian YouTuber and video game developer
 Dani (singer) (Danièle Graule, born 1944), French singer and actress

Given name
 Dani Alves (born 1983), Brazilian footballer
 Dani Behr (born 1974), British TV presenter
 Dani Bondar (born 1987), Israeli football player
 Dani Borreguero (born 1975), Spanish footballer
 Dani Carvajal (born 1992), Spanish footballer
 Dani Ceballos (born 1996), Spanish footballer
 Dani Cimorelli, American musician
 Dani Dimitrovska (born 1979), Macedonian pop and rock singer
 Dani Drews (born 1999), American volleyball player
 Dani Filth (born 1973), British musician, leader of Cradle of Filth
 Dani García (footballer, born 1974), Spanish striker
 Danielle Goldstein (born 1985), American-Israeli show jumper known as Dani
 Danielson Gomes Monteiro (born 1984), Cape Verdean footballer known as Dani
 Dani Gómez, Spanish singer known professionally as Kaydy Cain
 Dani Harmer (born 1989), British actress
 Dani Miguélez (born 1985), Spanish footballer
 Dani Rodrik (born 1957), Turkish economist
 Dani Stevenson (born 1980), American R&B singer
 Dani Klein (born 1953), lead singer of the Belgian band Vaya Con Dios

Surname
 Ahmad Hasan Dani (1920–2009), Pakistani scholar
 Amit Dani (born 1973), Indian cricketer for Mumbai
 Ashu Dani (born 1974), Indian cricketer for Delhi
 Ashwin Dani, Indian entrepreneur
 Bal Dani (1933–1999), Indian cricketer
 Elhaida Dani (born 1993), Albanian singer
 Elibeidy Dani (born 1997), Dominican fashion model
 Filippo Dani (born 1999), Italian football player
 Francesca Dani (born 1979), Italian travel photographer
 Harsheel Dani (born 1996), Indian badminton player
 Kouch Dani (born 1990), French-born Cambodian footballer
 Nándor Dáni (1871–1949), Hungarian track athlete
 Omar Dani (1924–2009), commander of the Indonesian Air Force from 1962 to 1965
 Peter Dani (fl. 1976, died 2002), American soccer player
 Prabhakar Balwant Dani (1908–1965), Indian Hindu nationalist
 Rajesh Dani (born 1961), Indian cricketer
 Riza Dani (1884–1949), Albanian politician and activist
 S. G. Dani (born 1947), Indian mathematician
 Said Abdullahi Dani, Somali politician
 Shashikala Dani (born 1959), Indian musician
 Zoltán Dani (born 1956), Yugoslav army officer
 Zsolt Dani (born 1969), Hungarian rower

Fictional characters
 Dani (Glee), a recurring character in the musical comedy-drama television series Glee
 Dani (Red Hot Chili Peppers), a girl appearing in several Red Hot Chili Peppers songs
 Dani Beck, on Law & Order: SVU
 Danielle Moonstar, nicknamed Dani, a comic book character associated with the X-Men 
 Dani Trant, main character from the 1991 film The Man in the Moon
 Dani Phantom, a girl cloned from the titular character of the Nicktoon Danny Phantom

Other uses
 Dani (magazine), a Bosnian-Herzegovinian news weekly
 , a Japanese martial arts ranking system, see Dan (rank)
 Dani languages, a family of Trans–New Guinea languages
 Deni language or Dani, an Arawan language of Brazil
 Dani (film) or Dany, a 2001 Indian Malayalam film
 Dani, Myanmar, a village in Rakhine State

See also 
 
 Danni, a given name
 Dannii Minogue (born 1971), Australian singer and actress
 Daani, a 2006 Pakistani film
 Daniel (disambiguation)
 Danielle
 Dany (disambiguation)

English feminine given names
Unisex given names